Carthara abrupta is a species of snout moth in the genus Carthara. It is found in Colombia and Brazil.

References

Moths described in 1881
Epipaschiinae